La Jaiba is a small town in the Puerto Plata province of the Dominican Republic.

Sources 
http://nona.net/features/map/placedetail.1529439/La%20Jaiba/
 – World-Gazetteer.com

Populated places in Puerto Plata Province